The Seventh Dynasty of Egypt would mark the beginning of the First Intermediate Period in the early 22nd century BC but its actual existence is debated. The only historical account on the Seventh Dynasty was in Manetho's Aegyptiaca, a history of Egypt written in the 3rd century BC, where the Seventh Dynasty appears essentially as a metaphor for chaos. Since next to nothing is known of this dynasty beyond Manetho's account, Egyptologists such as Jürgen von Beckerath and Toby Wilkinson have usually considered it to be fictitious. In a 2015 re-appraisal of the fall of the Old Kingdom, the Egyptologist Hracht Papazian has proposed that the Seventh Dynasty was real and that it consisted of kings usually attributed to the Eighth Dynasty.

Historical sources 
Based on the now lost writings of Africanus (c. 160–240) and Eusebius (c. 260–340), themselves based on the now lost work of the Egyptian priest Manetho (3rd century BC), the Byzantine scholar George Syncellus (died after 810) variously assigns to the period after the Sixth dynasty – the Seventh Dynasty – 70 kings in 70 days (Africanus) or 5 kings in 75 days (Eusebius). According to Manetho, these kings would have ruled in Memphis. Rather than a historical reality, this rapid succession of kings has long been interpreted as a metaphor for chaos.

Some Egyptologists, such as Papazian (2015), believe that this interpretation may give undue weight to Manetho's writings, and that it distorts the general scholarly understanding of the end of the Old Kingdom. According to Papazian (2015), "a re-examination ... of the Seventh Dynasty's existence, remains fully justified" and some of the kings usually attributed to the mid-Eighth Dynasty should instead be understood to belong to the Seventh Dynasty. Being attested by two additional ancient historical sources as well as archeological evidence, the Eighth Dynasty is not quite as obscure as the Seventh. As a consequence, some Egyptologists combine the Seventh and Eighth Dynasty into a single line of kings, reigning immediately after the Sixth Dynasty.

List of rulers 
The Seventh Dynasty is usually considered fictitious and is thus either ignored altogether by modern scholars or it is combined with the Eighth Dynasty. The Egyptologist Hracht Papazian has proposed in 2015 that a number of rulers usually seen as belonging to the mid-Eighth Dynasty identified by the Abydos King List should be attributed to a Seventh Dynasty:

References 

 
States and territories established in the 3rd millennium BC
States and territories disestablished in the 3rd millennium BC
07
07
3rd-millennium BC establishments in Egypt
3rd-millennium BC disestablishments in Egypt